FHC may refer to:

Education 
 Father Henry Carr Catholic Secondary School, in Etobicoke, Ontario, Canada
 Flat Hat Club, an American fraternity
 Forest Hill College, in Australia
 Forest Hills Central High School, in Grand Rapids, Michigan, United States
 Francis Howell Central High School, in St. Charles, Missouri, United States

Other uses 
 Family History Center (LDS Church), a branch of the Family History Library of the Church of Jesus Christ of Latter-day Saints
 Fernando Henrique Cardoso (born 1931), 34th President of Brazil from 1995 to 2003
 Field Hockey Canada, a sports organization
 Financial holding company, a bank holding company or company which owns several finance-industry companies
 Fitz-Hugh–Curtis syndrome, a complication of pelvic inflammatory disease
 Fixed-head coupé, an automobile form
 Flying Heritage Collection, an American aviation museum
 Free Hugs Campaign, a social movement
 Frölunda HC, a Swedish ice hockey club
 Ferritin heavy chain (FTH1), an enzyme
 Fremont Hotel and Casino, in Las Vegas